Skelton is an unincorporated community in Logan County, Illinois, United States. Skelton is located on Illinois Route 10, east of Lincoln.The elevation of Skelton is 610 feet.

References

Unincorporated communities in Logan County, Illinois
Unincorporated communities in Illinois